Françoise Laurent-Perrigot (born 27 February 1950) was a member of the Senate of France, who represented the Gard department.  She is a member of the Socialist Party.

References
Page on the Senate website

1950 births
Living people
Socialist Party (France) politicians
French Senators of the Fifth Republic
Women members of the Senate (France)
Senators of Gard
Place of birth missing (living people)